Belcoville Post Office is located in the Belcoville section of Weymouth Township, Atlantic County, New Jersey, United States. The building was built in 1918 and added to the National Register of Historic Places on March 14, 2008.

See also
National Register of Historic Places listings in Atlantic County, New Jersey

References

National Register of Historic Places in Atlantic County, New Jersey
New Jersey Register of Historic Places
Weymouth Township, New Jersey
Post office buildings on the National Register of Historic Places in New Jersey
Government buildings completed in 1918
1918 establishments in New Jersey
Neoclassical architecture in New Jersey